Comospermum is a genus of one species of flowering plant found  in southern Japan. In the APG III classification system, it is placed in the family Asparagaceae, subfamily Nolinoideae (formerly the family Ruscaceae).

The only species is  Comospermum yedoense  (Maxim. ex Franch. & Sav.) Rauschert.

References

Monotypic Asparagaceae genera
Nolinoideae
Endemic flora of Japan